VRM-30 is a Fleet Logistics Multi-Mission Squadron of the United States Navy.

The squadron was established on December 14, 2018 at Naval Air Station North Island, California but did not gain any aircraft until June 22, 2020, the aircraft being a CMV-22B; a carrier onboard delivery variant of the Bell Boeing V-22 Osprey which will eventually replace the Grumman C-2 Greyhound.

References

Aircraft squadrons of the United States Navy